PUZ may refer to:
 Puz (band), a punk rock band from Hong Kong
 Puerto Cabezas Airport, an airport in Puerto Cabezas, Nicaragua
 puz, a file format used to store crossword puzzles